The Men's team sprint at the 2014 UCI Track Cycling World Championships was held on 26 February 2014. Thirty-six cyclists from 12 countries participated in the contest. After all teams have contested qualifying, the fastest two squads advanced to the final and raced for the gold medal, while the teams ranked third and fourth, raced for the bronze medal.

Medalists

Results

Qualifying
The qualifying was started at 19:20.

Finals
The finals were started at 20:45.

References

2014 UCI Track Cycling World Championships
UCI Track Cycling World Championships – Men's team sprint